Azzanello is a comune (municipality) in the Province of Cremona in the Italian region Lombardy, located about  southeast of Milan and about  northwest of Cremona.

Azzanello borders the following municipalities: Borgo San Giacomo, Casalmorano, Castelvisconti, Genivolta, Villachiara.

References

Cities and towns in Lombardy